The Great Mr. Handel is a 1942 British Technicolor historical film directed by Norman Walker and starring Wilfrid Lawson, Elizabeth Allan and Malcolm Keen. The film is a biopic of the 18th-century German-British composer Georg Friedrich Händel, focusing in particular on the years leading up to his 1741 oratorio Messiah.

Production and release
The film was made by the Rank Organisation at Denham Studios, using Technicolor. After a private screening, the company head J. Arthur Rank criticised its lack of glamorous appeal. The film was not a box office success on its release.

Main cast
 Wilfrid Lawson as George Frideric Handel 
 Elizabeth Allan as Mrs. Cibber 
 Malcolm Keen as Lord Chesterfield 
 Michael Shepley as Sir Charles Marsham 
 Max Kirby as Frederick, Prince of Wales 
 Hay Petrie as Phineas 
 Morris Harvey as John Heidegger 
 A. E. Matthews as Charles Jennens 
 Frederick Cooper as Pooley 
 Andrew Leigh as Captain Coram

References

Bibliography
 Harper, Sue. Picturing the Past: The Rise and Fall of the British Costume Film. British Film Institute, 1994.
 Macnab, Geoffrey. J. Arthur Rank and the British Film Industry. Routledge, 1994.
 Murphy, Robert. Realism and Tinsel: Cinema and Society in Britain, 1939-1949. Routledge, 1989.

External links

1942 films
British biographical films
British historical musical films
1940s biographical films
1940s historical musical films
1940s English-language films
Films directed by Norman Walker
Films set in Dublin (city)
Films set in London
Films set in the 1740s
Films about composers
George Frideric Handel in fiction
Cultural depictions of George Frideric Handel
Films shot at Denham Film Studios
1940s British films